The 2003 Brabantse Pijl was the 43rd edition of the Brabantse Pijl cycle race and was held on 30 March 2003. The race started in Zaventem and finished in Alsemberg. The race was won by Michael Boogerd.

General classification

References

2003
Brabantse Pijl